Accentus (or Accentus Ecclesiasticus; Ecclesiastical accent) is a style of church music that emphasizes spoken word. It is often contrasted with concentus, an alternative style that emphasizes harmony. The terms accentus and concentus were probably introduced by Andreas Ornithoparchus in his Musicae Activae Micrologus, Leipzig, 1517. "Concentus might be chief ruler over all things that are sung...and Accentus over all things that are read," according to Ornithoparchus. The style is also known as liturgical recitative, though it differs in some important ways from other types of recitative.

In the medieval church, all that portion of the liturgical song which was performed by the entire choir, or by sections of it, was called concentus; thus hymns, psalms, mass ordinary, and alleluias were, generally speaking, included under this term, as well as anything with more complex or distinctive melodic contours. On the other hand, such parts of the liturgy which the priest, the deacon, the subdeacon, or the acolyte sang alone were called accentus; such were the collects, the epistle and gospel, the preface, or anything which was recited chiefly on one tone, rather than sung, by the priest or one of his assistants. The accentus should never be accompanied by harmonies, whether of voices or of instruments, although the concentus may receive such accompaniment. The intoning words Gloria in excelsis Deo and Credo in Unum Deum, being assigned to the celebrant alone, should not be repeated by the choir or accompanied by the organ or other musical instrument.

There were originally seven types of Accentus Ecclesiasticus, depending on how the voice should be inflected at the punctuation marks ending phrases or sentences. In accentus immutabilis, the voice remains at the same tone; in accentus medus it falls by a third at a colon; in accentus gravis it falls by a fifth at a period; in accentus actus it falls by a third and returns to the original tone at a comma; in accentus moderatus it rises by a second and returns to the original tone at a comma; in accentus interrogata it falls by a second and returns to the original tone at a question mark; and in accentus finalis, it rises by a second and then falls stepwise to a fourth below the original tone at the end.

References

Order of Mass
Latin religious words and phrases
Musical terminology